Luigi Maria Bilio, C.R.S.P. (25 March 1826 – 30 January 1884), was a Cardinal of the Roman Catholic Church who, among other offices, was Secretary of the Supreme Sacred Congregation of the Holy Office.

Life
Bilio was born in Alessandria, Piedmont, Italy. He joined the Clerics Regular of Saint Paul (Barnabites) when he was 14 years old and professed religious vows in Genoa in 1842. He was ordained in 1849 in Vercelli.

After his ordination, Bilio served as a professor of Greek and philosophy at the Collegio Ducale in Parma; and in Naples. He was a professor of philosophy, theology and canon law in Rome. He was elected Assistant Superior General of his Order. Bilio later worked as a consultor to the Congregation of the Inquisition from 1864 and for the Congregation of the Index from 1865. He had an important role in the preparation of the Syllabus of Errors and of the encyclical Quanta cura of Pope Pius IX.

Cardinalate
Bilio was created Cardinal Priest, with the titular church of San Lorenzo in Panisperna by Pope Pius IX in the consistory of 22 June 1866. He participated in the First Vatican Council from 1869 until 1870.

Episcopate
Biglio was promoted to the rank of Cardinal Bishop, and the suburbicarian see of Sabina, on 22 December 1873. He was consecrated as a bishop on 12 January of the following year by Pope Pius IX. He was appointed as the Prefect of the Sacred Congregation of Rites on 20 December 1876.

Biglio was nominated for the papacy during the conclave of 1878 but received only a handful of votes. The conclave elected Gioachino Pecci, who took the papal throne as Pope Leo XIII. Biglio was soon appointed as Prefect of the Sacred Congregation of Indulgences and Relics by Pope Leo in 1878. Pope Leo also appointed him to serve as Apostolic Penitentiary on 18 October 1877, a position he held until his death. He also served as Secretary of the Holy Office from January 1883 until his death one year later.

Biglio died in January 1884, his body lay in state in the Church of Santi Biagio e Carlo ai Catinari in Rome and was buried in the crypt of his Order in the Campo Verano cemetery.

References

1826 births
1884 deaths
People from Alessandria
Members of the Barnabite Order
Members of the Sacred Congregation for Rites
19th-century Italian cardinals
Cardinals created by Pope Pius IX
Participants in the First Vatican Council
19th-century Italian Roman Catholic bishops
Cardinal-bishops of Sabina
Members of the Holy Office
Major Penitentiaries of the Apostolic Penitentiary
Burials at Campo Verano